Football for Hope was a FIFA-sponsored football match played between the Ronaldinho XI team and the Shevchenko XI team on 15 February 2005 at the Camp Nou in Barcelona in support of the relief effort after the 2004 Indian Ocean tsunami disaster. 

Organised by FIFA and UEFA in consultation with the Royal Spanish Football Federation, and with support from FC Barcelona, who provided their stadium and staff free of charge, this benefit match for the victims of the tsunami saw an XI led by Ronaldinho, the 2004 FIFA World Player of the Year, beat a team captained by Andriy Shevchenko, the 2004 European Footballer of the Year, by six goals to three.

FIFA hoped to raise £7 million in support of the tsunami victims, around a third through the game itself. All proceeds from the Football For Hope match went to the FIFA/Asian Football Confederation Tsunami Solidarity Fund.

In 2011, FIFA won the Sport for Health Award at the Beyond Sport Awards ceremony.

The match
The game itself, which was watched by some 35,000 spectators, was a typical charity affair with a predictable pace, although the fans were entertained by a feast of goals. 

Cameroon's Samuel Eto'o and Senegal's Henri Camara both scored two goals, which, along with strikes from Ronaldinho and the South Korean Cha Du-ri, helped the FIFA World Player of the Year's team to victory. Alessandro Del Piero, Gianfranco Zola and David Suazo scored for Andriy Shevchenko's side.

Shevchenko XI
*Coaches:
 Marcello Lippi — Italy
 Arsène Wenger — Arsenal

Ronaldinho XI
Coaches:
 Carlos Alberto Parreira — Brazil
 Frank Rijkaard — Barcelona

See also
World Cricket Tsunami Appeal
IRB Rugby Aid Match

References

External links 

2005 in association football
Association football matches in Spain
2004 Indian Ocean earthquake and tsunami
Football in Barcelona
2004–05 in Spanish football
Charity football matches